John Leslie "Les" Moore (7 July 1933 – 1992) was an English footballer who made 203 appearances in the Football League playing for Derby County and Lincoln City. He played as a centre half. He played for Worksop Town in the Midland League before joining Derby County for a £1,000 fee, and also played non-league football for Boston United and Buxton, who he also managed until 1970. He remained a semi-professional footballer throughout his career, while working as an insurance salesman.

References

1933 births
1992 deaths
Footballers from Sheffield
English footballers
Association football defenders
Worksop Town F.C. players
Derby County F.C. players
Boston United F.C. players
Lincoln City F.C. players
Buxton F.C. players
Midland Football League players
English Football League players
Place of death missing
English football managers
Buxton F.C. managers